|}

The Albany Stakes is a Group 3 flat horse race in Great Britain open to two-year-old fillies. It is run at Ascot over a distance of 6 furlongs (1,207 metres), and it is scheduled to take place each year in June.

The event was established in 2002, and it was initially classed at Listed level and run as the Henry Carnavon Stakes in memory of Henry Herbert, 7th Earl of Carnarvon, Queen Elizabeth II's racing manager, who had died in September 2001. It was first run under its present title in 2003 and was promoted to Group 3 status in 2005.

The race is currently held on the fourth day of the five-day Royal Ascot meeting.

Records
Leading jockey (4 wins):
 Jamie Spencer – La Chunga (2005), Nijoom Dubai (2007), Samitar (2011), Kiyoshi (2013)

Leading trainer (3 wins):
 Mick Channon – Silca's Gift (2003), Nijoom Dubai (2007), Samitar (2011)

Winners

See also
 Horse racing in Great Britain
 List of British flat horse races

References
 Racing Post:

 galopp-sieger.de – Albany Stakes.
 ifhaonline.org – International Federation of Horseracing Authorities – Albany Stakes (2019).
 pedigreequery.com – Albany Stakes – Royal Ascot.

Flat races in Great Britain
Ascot Racecourse
Flat horse races for two-year-old fillies
Recurring sporting events established in 2002
2002 establishments in England